Mostyn Cottage is a building in Luss, Argyll and Bute, Scotland. It is a Category B listed structure dating to the mid 19th century.

The building, a single-storey cottage located on Pier Road, is made of whinstone and sandstone rubble with pink sandstone margins and dressings. It has projecting bracketed eaves. It possesses leaded casement windows and octagonal ridge chimney stacks with octagonal cans. It is a variant of the common form of cottage found elsewhere on the street.

The building is shown on the first-edition Ordnance Survey map, surveyed in 1864.

See also
List of listed buildings in Luss, Argyll and Bute

References

External links
View of the building – Google Street View, October 2016

19th-century establishments in Scotland
Listed buildings in Luss, Argyll and Bute
Category B listed buildings in Argyll and Bute